Paul Dawson may refer to:
Paul Dawson (American football) (born 1993), linebacker for the Cincinnati Bengals
Paul Dawson (actor), American actor, DJ and writer
Paul Dawson (lacrosse) (born 1985), Canadian lacrosse player
Paul Dawson (politician) (born 1944), New Brunswick MLA
Paul Dawson (professor) (born 1972), poet and professor from Australia
Paul Dawson (rugby league) (born 1948), Australian rugby league footballer
Paul Dawson, American music producer and songwriter known professionally as Hollywood Hot Sauce